Xavier Thomas (born December 20, 1999) is an American football defensive end for the Clemson Tigers.

High school career 
After playing for three years in Florence, SC at Wilson High School, Thomas played his senior season at IMG Academy in Florida.

College career 
After recording forty-three tackles, three and a half sacks, and two pass breakups in his freshman season, Thomas was named to USA Today's Freshman All-America Team. During the 2019 season, he earned Third Team All-Atlantic Coast Conference honors after posting 31 tackles, 8 tackles for loss and two sacks. Thomas contracted COVID-19 and strep throat in July 2020, and announced he would redshirt the 2020 season. However, after the NCAA declared that all players could participate in the season without losing a year of eligibility, Thomas decided to play, despite missing summer workouts. On October 31, 2020, Thomas was ejected for targeting Boston College quarterback Phil Jurkovec. He missed the first half of the following game against Notre Dame.

References 

1999 births
Living people
American football defensive ends
Clemson Tigers football players
Players of American football from South Carolina
Sportspeople from Florence, South Carolina